Flavio Giupponi (born 9 May 1964 in Bergamo) is an Italian former professional road racing cyclist.

Professional career
Giupponi was as professional cyclist from 1985 to 1994. His best Grand Tour result was at the 1989 Giro d'Italia where he won Stage 14 in the high mountains and finished on the podium in 2nd place overall just 1:15 behind Laurent Fignon. He also won the Giro dell'Appennino in 1990.

Major results

1984
 2nd GP Capodarco
1985
 1st  Overall Giro delle Regioni
1st Stage 2b
 1st  Overall Giro della Valle d'Aosta
 1st  Overall Settimana Ciclistica Lombarda
1986
 1st Stage 3 Giro d'Italia (TTT)
 6th Giro di Lombardia
1987
 2nd Milano–Torino
 5th Overall Giro d'Italia
 8th Giro di Lombardia
1988
 1st Cronostaffetta (TTT)
 1st Stage 3 Volta a Catalunya (TTT)
 4th Overall Giro d'Italia
1989
 2nd Overall Giro d'Italia
1st Stage 14
1990
 1st Giro dell'Appennino
 3rd National Road Race Championships
 3rd Gran Premio Città di Camaiore
1991
 9th Tre Valli Varesine
1994
 8th Overall Tour de Suisse

Grand Tour general classification results timeline

References

Italian male cyclists
Cyclists from Bergamo
1964 births
Living people
Italian Giro d'Italia stage winners